not to be confused with Naktsang Town in the Haa District of southwestern Bhutan

Xainza (also Naktsang, Xainza Town or Shantsa) is a town and township-level administrative unit and seat of Shentsa County or Xainza County, Nagqu Prefecture, Tibet Autonomous Region, China.

It covers an area of 2146 square kilometres and in 2004 had a total population of about 17,000. The township was established by the Chinese in 1961. The main occupation is animal husbandry, mainly yak, goat and sheep rearing.

Villages
The township-level division contains the following settlements:

Gasangduo (neighborhood) (嘎桑多居委会) 	
Rongsaiduo (neighborhood)	(融塞多居委会) 	
Nacha (拿查村) 	
Luopu (罗普村 )	
Qiangrong (羌戎村) 	
Qubu (曲布村) 	
Yongzhu Woma (永珠沃玛村) 
Rennaduo (仁那多村)

Footnotes

References
 Dorje, Gyurme. Footprint Tibet Handbook. 4th Edition. (2009) Bath, U.K.

External links
Photo of Xainza Town

Populated places in Nagqu
Township-level divisions of Tibet
Xainza County